Amit Chaudhary, is an Indian bodybuilder. He participated in World Games 2005 and 2009 representing India. National Gold medal total 18 time First Indian Bodybuilding Athlete who Place in World Games 2004, Antop Germany Only Indian Bodybuilding Athlete who Passed the Dope Test in 13 time Delhi.
He is married to Romy Chaudhary 
And has a daughter named Shivika Chaudhary.
He is currently living in Bulandshahar

.

Participation history

References

1973 births
Indian bodybuilders
Living people
Competitors at the 2005 World Games
Competitors at the 2009 World Games